Ahmad Masoumifar (Persian:احمد معصومی فر; born 21 march 1961) is an Iranian career diplomat and the current Ambassador of Iran in Sweden. He was formerly the Director General for Economic Affairs at the Ministry of Foreign Affairs and the Secretary of Iran’s Foreign Economic Relations Coordination Committee.

Masoumifar was educated at the University of Tehran. He holds a Masters in Development Economics and a Doctorate in Business Administration. Masoumifar joined the Ministry of Foreign Affairs in 1986.

He has served as Iran’s Consul General to Shanghai, chargé d'affaires in Kuala Lumpur, Ambassador to South Korea, and currently Ambassador to Sweden.

His previous roles within the Ministry of Foreign Affairs include, Head of Investments and Special Economic Plans Department, Head of the Office of Economic Cooperation with the Americas, Deputy Director General of Economic Affairs, and Director General for Economic Affairs and the Secretary of Iran’s Foreign Economic Relations Coordination Committee.

References 

Living people
21st-century Iranian diplomats
1961 births
Ambassadors of Iran to Sweden
University of Tehran alumni